{{DISPLAYTITLE:C8H16O6}}
The molecular formula C8H16O6 (molar mass: 208.21 g/mol, exact mass: 208.0947 u) may refer to:

 Pinpollitol
 Viscumitol

Molecular formulas